Chan Joseph Khun Sing (born 6 March 1949) is a Singaporean former sailor. He competed at the 1988 Summer Olympics and the 1992 Summer Olympics.

References

External links
 
 

1949 births
Living people
Singaporean male sailors (sport)
Olympic sailors of Singapore
Sailors at the 1988 Summer Olympics – 470
Sailors at the 1992 Summer Olympics – 470
Place of birth missing (living people)